Lock Island is a member of the Arctic Archipelago in the territory of Nunavut. It lies in Peel Sound across the mouth of Browne Bay, between northeastern Prince of Wales Island and northwestern Somerset Island. Vivian Island lies to the southeast, and Binstead Island to the northeast.

References

External links 
 Lock Island (Nunavut) in the Atlas of Canada - Toporama; Natural Resources Canada

Uninhabited islands of Qikiqtaaluk Region